The Neuroimaging Informatics Technology Initiative (NIfTI) is an open file format commonly used to store brain imaging data obtained using Magnetic Resonance Imaging methods.

References

External links 
 https://brainder.org/2012/09/23/the-nifti-file-format/

Open formats